Love Is in the Air may refer to:

Film and television
Love Is in the Air (2005 film), a French film starring Marion Cotillard
Love Is in the Air (2011 film), a Danish film 
Love Is in the Air (2012 film), an Italian film starring Claudia Gerini
Love Is in the Air (2013 film), a French film starring Ludivine Sagnier

TV
Love is in the Air, the title of Turkish TV series Sen Çal Kapımı in Italy, South America and Spain
Love is in the Air, a 2003 TV series from Australian Broadcast Corporation, see List of programs broadcast by ABC Television
"Love Is in the Air" (Desperate Housewives), an episode of the American television series Desperate Housewives

Music
Love Is in the Air (studio album), a 1978 album by John Paul Young
Love Is in the Air (compilation album), a 1978 compilation album by John Paul Young
"Love Is in the Air" (song), a 1977 disco song by John Paul Young
"Love Is in the Air", a 2013 song by Toya Delazy from Due Drop
Love Is in the Air, a 2019 album by The Ten Tenors